Kamil Iskhakov, (born February 8, 1949 in Kazan) is Russian regional development minister's assistant. He is of Tatar descent.

He is a graduate of Kazan Technical School and physical department Kazan State University.  In the 1980s, he was the Director of the Kazan Science and Education Center and The Kazan Science and Manufacturing Association.  From 1989-1991, he was the Chairman of the Kazan City Council Executive Committee.  Between 1991 and 2005, Member of the Kazan City Council of Peoples Deputies, Chairman of the Kazan City Council of Peoples Deputies, Head of the Kazan City Administration.  In 2005-2007 he was the Presidential Envoy to the Far East District.

Honours and awards
 Order of Merit for the Fatherland;
3rd class (19 July 2004) - for outstanding contribution to the implementation of socio-economic reforms in the city and many years of diligent work
4th class (13 April 1999) - for outstanding contribution to the socio-economic development of the city and many years of diligent work
 Order of Honour (7 June 1996) - for services to the state, a large contribution to the construction of social and cultural facilities in the city of Kazan and many years of diligent work
 Medal "In Commemoration of the 1000th Anniversary of Kazan"
 Medal "For Valiant Labour. To commemorate the 100th anniversary of VI Lenin"
 Order of St. Sergius, 2nd class (Russian Orthodox Church, 2005)
 Laureate of the USSR Council of Ministers (1986)
 Honorary Worker Housing in Russia (1998)
 Certificate of Merit of the Republic of Tatarstan (1998)
 Honorary Citizen of Kazan (2006)

External links
Short Bio on Kamil Isxaqov

1949 births
1st class Active State Councillors of the Russian Federation
Politicians from Kazan
Living people
Volga Tatar people
Tatar politicians
Recipients of the Order "For Merit to the Fatherland", 3rd class
Recipients of the Order of Honour (Russia)